The Bolivia national football team, also known as La Verde, has represented Bolivia in international football since 1926. Organized by the Bolivian Football Federation (FBF), it is one of the ten members of FIFA's South American Football Confederation (CONMEBOL).

After playing in the 1930 and 1950 World Cups, they have qualified just once, in 1994, where they were eliminated in the group stage. Bolivia have never advanced past the first round of any World Cup, and have only scored one goal, in 1994. Despite their World Cup performances, Bolivia won the Copa América at home in 1963, and finished runners-up in 1997, which they also hosted. At the 2015 Copa América in Chile, they advanced to the quarter-finals for the first time since 1997, after defeating Ecuador 3–2. This also ended a winless streak in the Copa América, with their last win being on 28 June 1997, when they defeated Mexico 1–0 in the semi-finals.

History

Bolivia debuted in international football in 1926, one year after the Bolivian Football Federation was founded, and joined FIFA that same year. As participants at the 1926 South American Championship in Chile, Bolivia played their first match against the hosts on 12 October 1926, and even ended up scoring first against them, but wound up being defeated by the Chileans 7–1. Bolivia also lost their following three matches: 0–5 against Argentina, 1–6 against Paraguay and 0–6 against Uruguay.

In 1930, Bolivia was one of the teams invited to the inaugural edition of the World Cup, held in Uruguay. Drawn in Group 2 of the 1930 World Cup, Bolivia lost both its games 4–0, first to Yugoslavia at the Estadio Parque Central, and then to Brazil in the Estadio Centenario. The match versus the Yugoslavs would be the last match against non-South American opposition for Bolivia until 1972 – when they again met Yugoslavia. They returned for the 1950 World Cup, where Argentina's withdrawal from the qualifiers gave Bolivia an automatic berth. With three teams declining to play in Brazil, Bolivia was put in a group of two along with Uruguay. The Bolivians' only game was an 8–0 defeat to Uruguay at the Estádio Independência in Belo Horizonte.

Bolivia's greatest football achievement was the 1963 South American Championship title, which they hosted and won after placing first out of 7 countries, including being undefeated, with five wins and one draw. The only draw for Bolivia in the tournament was a 4–4 draw against Ecuador in the opening match. They also had the advantage of being better accustomed to higher altitudes. In the following edition, the 1967 South American Championship, held in Uruguay, Bolivia finished last out of six teams, with one draw and four losses, which was far below what the public expected, as Bolivia had been the defending champion.

Afterwards, the country only started to resurge at an international level with the creation of the Academia Tahuichi Aguilera in Santa Cruz de la Sierra in 1978, a football school that developed players such as Marco Etcheverry, Erwin Sánchez and Luis Cristaldo.

Under Spanish coach Xabier Azkargorta and featuring nine players from Tahuichi, Bolivia surprisingly became the first team to beat Brazil in the 1994 World Cup qualifiers while playing them in La Paz, with a 2–0 win, and qualified for the 1994 World Cup by finishing second in Group B behind the Brazilians themselves, which included record 7–0 and 7–1 wins over Venezuela during their qualification campaign.

Bolivia was drawn into the tournament's Group C, and played defending champions Germany in the tournament's opening match at Soldier Field. Bolivia played a great first half, outplaying Germany. In the second half, Lothar Matthäus took a 40-yard run and struck Marco "El Diablo" Etcheverry with a high elbow to his jaw. Etcheverry retaliated by fouling Matthäus and was sent off. Eventually, Bolivia lost on a controversial offside goal by Jürgen Klinsmann. Following a goalless draw with South Korea at Foxboro Stadium, where Bolivia was forced to play with ten men again after Cristaldo's red card, Bolivia returned to Chicago and lost 3–1 to Spain, with Sánchez scoring the first ever Bolivian goal in a World Cup.

Following the World Cup, Bolivia participated in the 1995 Copa América held in Uruguay, with Antonio Lopez Habas as manager, where they made the quarter-finals for the first time since winning the competition in 1963, with one win, one draw, and one loss. In the quarter-finals, the nation lost to hosts Uruguay 2–1. Despite the decent performance the team displayed during the tournament, Lopez Habas left his post shortly before the 1997 Copa America, being replaced by Dušan Drašković. The 1997 edition was the second time Bolivia held the tournament. The team reached the final, as had happened last time Bolivia was the host, but this time they finished runner-up to reigning world champion Brazil after losing 3–1 in the final.

With their runner-up finish at the previous Copa America, Bolivia made their first and only FIFA Confederations Cup appearance in the 1999 edition, this time under new Argentine manager Héctor Veira. Bolivia was placed in group A along with hosts Mexico, Saudi Arabia, and Egypt. Their campaign started with a 2–2 draw against Egypt. Their next match was a 0–0 draw against Saudi Arabia. For their last match in the group, they had to play hosts Mexico, in which Bolivia lost 0–1 with a goal from Francisco Palencia. Bolivia finished third in the group with two draws and a loss, being eliminated from the tournament in the first stage.

In the 2015 Copa América in Chile, under Bolivian manager Mauricio Soria, Bolivia were placed in Group A, with Chile, Mexico, and Ecuador. In their match against Mexico, Bolivia drew 0–0. However, against Ecuador, Bolivia won 3–2, with goals from Raldes, Smedberg-Dalence, and Moreno. From this victory against Ecuador, Bolivia made it to the next round, the quarter-finals, for the first time since the 1997 tournament, which they hosted. Bolivia were defeated by Peru 1–3 in the quarter-finals of the tournament, and Bolivia's only goal of the game was a penalty in the last minutes of the match scored by Marcelo Moreno.

Stadium
Many visiting teams have protested that the altitude gives Bolivia an unfair advantage against opponents. On 27 May 2007, FIFA declared that no World Cup Qualifying matches could be played in stadiums above 8,200 feet (2,500 m) above sea level. However, FIFA raised the altitude limit to 3,000 meters a month later after negative feedback against the ban, and included a special exception for La Paz, thus allowing the stadium to continue holding World Cup qualifying matches. A year after the original ban, in May 2008, FIFA removed the altitude limit entirely.

Team image

Kit history
Bolivia's first uniforms were all white. In the 1930 FIFA World Cup, before the match with Yugoslavia, Bolivia painted one of the letters in "Viva Uruguay" in each of the eleven starters' jerseys to please the local crowd. In the following game with Brazil, given the adversary also wore white, Bolivia instead borrowed Uruguay's own blue uniform to play. Bolivia again painted a message to the hosts in the 1945 South American Championship, with the players' jerseys reading "Viva Chile". In 1946, Bolivia changed their jersey colors to black and white stripes, like the colors of the Cochabamba region. FBF reverted to white the following year. In 1957, FBF decided to use one of the colors in the Flag of Bolivia. Given red and yellow were used by many of the other South Americans, green became the primary color, leading to the nickname "La Verde" ("The Green").

Kit sponsorship

Results and fixtures

2022

2023

Coaching staff

Coaching history
Caretaker managers are listed in italics.

 Jose de la Cerda (1926)
 Jorge Valderrama (1927–1929)
 Ulises Saucedo (1930–1937)
 Julio Borelli (1938–1945)
 Diógenes Lara (1945–1947)
 Félix Deheza (1948–1950)
 Mario Pretto (1950–1952)
 César Viccino (1953–1958)
 Vicente Arraya (1959)
 Danilo Alvim (1960–1965)
 Dan Georgiadis (1966–1967)
 Rudi Gutendorf (1974)
 Ramiro Blacut (1979–1981)
 Raúl Pino (1985)
 Ramiro Blacut (1985–1987)
 Jorge Habegger (1988–1990)
 Ramiro Blacut (1991–1992)
 Xabier Azkargorta (1993–1994)
 Antonio López Habas (1995–1997)
 Dušan Drašković (1997–1998)
 Héctor Veira (1998–2000)
 Carlos Aragonés (2000–2001)
 Jorge Habegger (2001)
  Carlos Trucco (2001–2002)
 Dalcio Giovagnoli (2003)
  Nelson Acosta (2003–2004)
 Ramiro Blacut (2004-2005)
 Erwin Sánchez (2006–2009)
 Eduardo Villegas (2009)
  Gustavo Quinteros (2010–2012)
 Xabier Azkargorta (2012–2014)
 Mauricio Soria   (2014)
 Nestor Clausen (2014)
 Mauricio Soria (2015)
 Julio César Baldivieso (2015–2016)
 Ángel Guillermo Hoyos  (2016)
 Mauricio Soria (2016–2018)
 César Farías (2018)
 Daniel Farías   (2018)
 Eduardo Villegas (2019)
 César Farías   (2019–2022)
  Pablo Escobar (2022)
 Gustavo Costas (2022–)

Players

Current squad
The following players were called up for the friendly matches against Uzbekistan and Saudi Arabia on 24 and 28 March 2023.

Caps and goals updated , after the game against Peru.

Recent call-ups
The following players have been called up during the last twelve months. Retired players are not included.

COV Withdrew from the squad due to COVID-19.
INJ Withdrew from the squad due to injury.
PRE Preliminary squad / standby.
RET Retired from the national team.
SUS Withdrew from the squad due to suspension.

Player records

Players in bold are still active with Bolivia.

Most caps

Most goals

Competitive record

FIFA World Cup

Copa América

 Champions   Runners-up   Third place   Fourth place

FIFA Confederations Cup

Pan American Games

Honours

Official
 South American Championship / Copa América:
 Winners (1): 1963
 Runners-up (1): 1997
 Fourth place (2): 1927, 1949

South American Tournaments
 Copa Paz del Chaco (vs ):
 Winners (4): 1957, 1962, 1979, 1993
  Copa Mariscal Sucre (vs ):
 Winners: 1973 (shared)

Olympic and Pan American Team
 Pan American Games:
 Fourth place (1): 2007
 South American Games:
  Bronze Medalists (2): 1978, 2010
 Bolivarian Games:
  Gold Medalists (4): 1970, 1977, 2003, 2009
  Silver Medalists (2): 1938, 1947-48 (shared)
  Bronze Medalists (2): 1965, 1973 (shared)

Notes

See also

Bolivia national under-23 football team
Bolivia national under-20 football team
Bolivia national under-17 football team
Bolivia national futsal team

References

External links

  
 Bolivia FIFA profile
 RSSSF archive of most capped players and highest goalscorers

 
Football in Bolivia
South American national association football teams